Clara Marin (born 17 March 1997) is a Chilean track and field athlete who specializes in the 100 metres hurdles and 400 metres hurdles.

She won the 2014 South American Youth Championships in Athletics on 400 m hurdles and got second place on the [100 m hurdles. She won the 2015 South American Junior Championships in Athletics on 100 m hurdles, achieving the championship record with a time of 13.48 seconds. She holds the youth and junior Chilean record in the 100 m hurdles and the youth Chilean record of the 400 m hurdles.

Personal bests

References

Living people
1997 births
Chilean female hurdlers